De Oudkerkermolen,  or Oudkerkemolen (English: Old Church Mill) is a smock mill in Aldtsjerk, Friesland, Netherlands which has been restored to working order. The mill is listed as a Rijksmonument, number 35674.

History

De Oudkerkermolen was built in 1864. On 13 March 1955 it was badly damaged in a storm. Repairs cost ƒ6,734, including new sails at ƒ3,200 and a new Archimedes' screw at ƒ1,950. The repairs were carried out by millwright De Roos of Leeuwarden. Further repairs were made to the mill in 1963.

The mill drained the  Oudkerkerpolder until 1970. A diesel engine formerly provided auxiliary power. It was restored in 1975. Although in working order, the mill just pumps water in a circuit to demonstrate the process.

Description

De Oudkerkermolen is a smock mill whose sails almost reach the ground. The mill has a single-storey brick base. The smock and cap are thatched. The mill is winded by a tailpole and winch. This was made by millwright H J Koning of Foxham in 1910. The windshaft also carries the brake wheel which has 50 cogs. This drives the wallower (29 cogs) at the top of the upright shaft. At the lower end of the upright shaft the crown wheel (37 cogs) drives the wooden Archimedes' screw via a gear wheel with 34 cogs. It is inclined at 19½°. Each turn of the screw lifts  of water.

Public access
De Oudkerkermolen is open to the public by appointment only.

References

Windmills in Friesland
Windmills completed in 1864
Smock mills in the Netherlands
Rijksmonuments in Friesland
Octagonal buildings in the Netherlands